KMRO (90.3 FM) is a non-commercial radio station licensed to Camarillo, California and broadcasting to the areas of Ventura County and southern Santa Barbara County, California. The station is owned by The Association For Community Education, Inc. and airs a Spanish-language Christian talk and teaching format. It is the flagship station of the religious radio network Radio Nueva Vida. In addition to its extensive network of translator stations, KMRO is simulcast on two full-power repeaters in California: KEYQ (980 AM) in Fresno and KGZO (90.9 FM) in Shafter.

History

KMRO
KMRO was first signed on January 19, 1987 by The Association for Community Education, Inc. KMRO is the flagship station of Radio Nueva Vida, a Spanish-language Christian talk and teaching radio network.

KEYQ
KEYQ first went on the air on October 14, 1957. It was purchased by Americom in 1967. From September 1992 to May 1993, the station held the call letters KFSO, after which it reverted to the KEYQ calls. In 1997, Jonna Hooker sold KEYQ to The Association for Community Education, Inc. for $200,000.

KGZO
The station signed on July 19, 1993, as KLOD; it was owned by High Adventure Ministries, Inc. KLOD changed its call sign to KGZO on April 5, 1996. In 1997, High Adventure Ministries sold KGZO to The Association for Community Education for $240,000.

Translators
KMRO is relayed by these translators to widen its broadcast area:

See also
Tele Vida Abundante

References

External links

MRO
American Basketball Association flagship radio stations
Radio stations established in 1987
1987 establishments in California
MRO
Camarillo, California
Mass media in Ventura County, California